John Lawrence Manning (sometimes spelled John Laurence Manning)  (January 29, 1816October 24, 1889) was the 65th Governor of South Carolina, from 1852 to 1854. He was born in Clarendon County. He attended South Carolina College, where he was a member of the Euphradian Society.

In 1838, John L. Manning married Susan Frances Hampton (1816–1845), daughter of General Wade Hampton I and his wife, Mary Cantey, and half-sister of Colonel Wade Hampton II, who though he alone inherited their father's considerable fortune, shared it equally with her and another sister. She died giving birth to their third child. In 1848 Manning married Sally Bland Clarke and had four children by her. During his term in office, he resided at the Preston C. Lorick House.

John Manning and his wife, Susan, had Millford Plantation built in 1839 near Pinewood, South Carolina. It is now a National Historic Landmark.

According to the 1860 United States Slave Census Schedule John Manning owned 670 enslaved African-Americans, making him the 6th largest American slave owner at the time.

He is interred in the churchyard at Trinity Episcopal Church in Columbia, South Carolina.

Honors 
The town of Manning, South Carolina was named for him.

References

External links 
 SCIway Biography of John Lawrence Manning
 NGA Biography of John Lawrence Manning

|-

1816 births
1889 deaths
19th-century American politicians
American slave owners
Confederate States Army officers
Democratic Party governors of South Carolina
Democratic Party United States senators from South Carolina
High Hills of Santee
Democratic Party members of the South Carolina House of Representatives
People from Clarendon County, South Carolina
People from Pinewood, South Carolina
People of South Carolina in the American Civil War
Princeton University alumni
Democratic Party South Carolina state senators
University of South Carolina alumni
University of South Carolina trustees
United States senators who owned slaves